Nuclear medicine physicians, also called nuclear radiologists or simply nucleologists, are medical specialists that use tracers, usually radiopharmaceuticals, for diagnosis and therapy.  Nuclear medicine procedures are the major clinical applications of molecular imaging and molecular therapy. In the United States, nuclear medicine physicians are certified by the American Board of Nuclear Medicine and the American Osteopathic Board of Nuclear Medicine.

History

In 1896, Henri Becquerel discovered radioactivity.  It was only a little over a quarter of a century (1925) until the first radioactive tracer study in animals was performed by George de Hevesy, and the next year (1926) the first diagnostic tracer study in humans was performed by Herman Blumgart and Otto Yens.

Some of the earliest applications of radioisotopes were therapy of hematologic malignancies and therapy of both benign and malignant thyroid disease.  In the 1950s radioimmunoassay was developed by Solomon Berson and Rosalyn Yalow.  Dr. Yalow was co-winner of the 1977 Nobel Prize in Physiology or Medicine (Dr. Berson had already died so was not eligible).  Radioimmunoassay was used extensively in clinical medicine but more recently has been largely replaced by non-radioactive methods.

In 1950, human imaging of both gamma and positron emitting radioisotopes was performed. Benedict Cassen's work with a directional probe lead to the development of the first imaging with a rectilinear scanner.  Gordon Brownell developed the first positron scanner.  In the same decade (1954) the Society of Nuclear Medicine (SNM) was organized in Spokane, Washington (US), and (1958) Hal Anger developed the gamma scintillation camera, which could image a whole region at the same time.

Initial introduction of radioisotopes into medicine required individuals to acquire of a considerable background information which was foreign to their medical training.  Often a particular application drove the introduction of radioisotopes into a health care facility.  As other applications developed the physician or group that had developed knowledge of and experience with radioisotopes usually provided the new service.  Consequently, the radioisotope service found homes in several established specialties – commonly in radiology due to an interest in imaging, in pathology (clinical pathology) due to an interest in radioimmunoassay, and in endocrinology due to the early application of 131I to thyroid disease.

Nuclear medicine became widespread and there was a need to develop a new specialty.  In the United States, the American Board of Nuclear Medicine was formed in 1972.  At that time, the specialty include all of the uses of radioisotopes in medicine – radioimmunoassay, diagnostic imaging, and therapy.  As use of and experience with radioisotopes became more widespread in medicine, radioimmunoassay generally transferred from nuclear medicine to clinical pathology.  Today, nuclear medicine is based on the use of the tracer principle applied to diagnostic imaging and therapy.

Practice

Procedures

 Examples of the most common clinical nuclear medicine procedures are
 glucose metabolic imaging with 18F-fluorodeoxyglucose (FDG) for cancer,
 myocardial perfusion imaging for coronary artery disease, and
 skeletal imaging for both benign and malignant bone disease.
 Examples of common procedures are
 brain perfusion and glucose metabolic imaging for seizure and dementia,
 blood pool imaging for myocardial function and gastrointestinal bleeding,
 gastric emptying studies for gastroparesis,
 hepatobiliary imaging for acute cholecystitis and gallbladder dysfunction,
 lymphoscintigraphy for sentinel lymph node biopsy,
 parathyroid imaging for hyperparathyroidism,
 pulmonary perfusion and ventilation imaging for pulmonary embolism,
 renal function imaging for various renal disorders,
 thyroid imaging for hyperthyroidism,
 thyroid whole body imaging for thyroid cancer,
 urinary tract imaging for vesicoureteral reflux, and
 white blood cell studies for infection.
 Examples of uncommon but valuable procedures are
 octreotide (pentetreotide) or NETSPOT (gallium 68) imaging for somatostatin receptors found on the surface of many tumors,
 meta-iodobenzylguanidine (MIBG) imaging for neuroendocrine tumors,
 heat-damaged red blood cell imaging for identifying ectopic splenic tissue, and
 gastric mucosa imaging for Meckel's diverticulum (especially in pediatrics).
 Examples of radionuclide therapeutic procedures are
 131I treatment of hyperthyroidism,
 131I treatment of thyroid cancer, and
 radioimmunotherapy with 90Y ibritumomab tiuxetan (Zevalin) & 131I tositumomab (Bexxar) therapy of low-grade non-Hodgkin's lymphoma.
188Re (Rhenium) as Rhenium-SCT for treatment of Non-Melanoma Skin Cancer (basal cell carcinoma or squamous cell carcinoma)

Instrumentation

 Planar imaging
Most radionuclides give off gamma-rays when they decay.  A 2-dimensional image of the radionuclide distribution can be made with a gamma camera, often called an Anger scintillation camera after its inventor, Hal Anger.
 Single photon emission computed tomography (SPECT)
Multiple planar images taken from different angles around a patient can be reconstructed to form a stack of cross-sectional, tomographic images.
 Positron emission tomography (PET)
Some isotopes emit positrons (the anti-matter equivalent of an electron) when they decay.  The positrons travel a short distance in tissue and then annihilate with an electron giving off two nearly back-to-back gamma rays.  Positron emission tomography takes advantage of these back-to-back gamma rays to localize the distribution of the radioisotopes.
 Combined molecular and anatomic imaging: SPECT/CT, PET/CT, and PET/MRI
The advantage of nuclear medicine is that it provides molecular and physiologic information, but it is relatively poor at providing anatomic information and the resolution is relatively poor.  In recent years, instruments have been developed which allow both radioisotope and anatomic imaging.  Most widespread are PET/CT scanners combining PET and computed tomography.  Increasingly common are SPECT/CT scanners.  Instruments combining PET with magnetic resonance, PET/MRI, are starting to be used.
 Non-imaging instrumentation
Non-imaging instruments are used for measuring radioisotope doses, for counting samples, for measuring thyroid uptake of radioiodine, for measuring sentinel lymph node uptake during mastectomy procedures to and for radiation safety.

Training 

In the United States, the Accreditation Council for Graduate Medical Education (ACGME) and the American Osteopathic Association Bureau of Osteopathic Specialists (AOABOS) accredit nuclear medicine residency programs, and the American Board of Nuclear Medicine (ABNM) and the American Osteopathic Board of Nuclear Medicine (AOBNM) certify nuclear medicine physicians. After completing medical school, a post-graduate clinical year is followed by three years of nuclear medicine residency.  A common alternate path for physicians who have completed a radiology residency is a one-year residency in nuclear medicine, leading to sub-specialty certification by the American Board of Radiology.  A less common path for physicians who have completed another residency is a two-year residency in nuclear medicine.

Other professionals 

Nuclear medicine procedures are performed by Nuclear Medicine Radiographers, who require extensive training both in underlying principles (physics, instrumentation) but also in the clinical applications.  Nursing support, especially in the hospital setting, is valuable, but may be shared with other services.  Nuclear medicine is a technology embedded specialty depending upon a large number of non-physician professional, including medical physicists, health physicists, radiobiologists, radiochemists, and radiopharmacists.

Residency trained nuclear medicine physicians have the most extensive training and highest level of certification, including all aspects of diagnosis and radionuclide therapy.  However, current U.S. regulations do not prohibit other physicians from interpreting nuclear medicine studies and perform radionuclide therapy.  Radiologists who are not sub-specialty trained in the specialty, nonetheless often limit their practice to practicing nuclear medicine.  Some cardiologists, especially non-invasive cardiologists, will interpret diagnostic cardiology studies including nuclear medicine studies.  Radiation oncologists perform all forms of radiation therapy, sometimes including radionuclide therapy.  Some endocrinologists treat hyperthyroidism and thyroid cancer with 131I.  The mix of physicians rendering nuclear medicine services varies both between different countries and within a single country.

See also 
 Radiographer

References

External links

 American Board of Nuclear Medicine
 American Osteopathic Board of Nuclear Medicine
 American Board of Medical Specialties
 International Atomic Energy Agency (IAEA), Division of Human Health, Nuclear Medicine
 Society of Nuclear Medicine and Molecular Imaging, formerly the Society of Nuclear Medicine (SNM)
 About nuclear medicine
 List of nuclear medicine societies

Nuclear medicine